Niels la Cour (born 14 November 1944) is a Danish composer.

Life
La Cour did his A levels in 1963 from the music branch of the Aurehøj Grammar School with organ as his speciality. Between 1964 and 1969 he was at the Royal Academy of Music in Copenhagen, graduating with diploma and music teacher's exam in the subjects music theory, music history, and ear training. He studied instrumentation and composition with Leif Kayser in 1973 and 1974 and at the Conservatorio di Santa Cecilia in Rome in 1975. Niels la Cour taught music theory at the Carl Nielsen Academy of Music in Odense between 1968 and 1977 and at the Royal Academy of Music in Copenhagen from 1978 onwards. He received a three-year scholarship from the Danish Arts Foundation in 1973, and in 1988 he was awarded "Choir Composer of the Year" by the Danish Amateur Choral Federation.

Works
La Cour's works include Three Latin Motets (Hodie Christus natus est, Ave Maria, and Laudate Dominum), which he composed in 1982.

External links
EWH profile

1944 births
Living people
Danish composers
Male composers
Accademia Nazionale di Santa Cecilia alumni
20th-century classical composers
21st-century classical composers
20th-century Danish male musicians
21st-century male musicians